refers to either of the following two adjoining train stations in Takarazuka, Japan, one operated by West Japan Railway Company, the other by Hankyu Railway.

West Japan Railway Company

Lines
Takarazuka Station operated by West Japan Railway Company is on the Fukuchiyama Line between Osaka and Fukuchiyama. All serving trains stop at the station as the core station of the Fukuchiyama Line, shown in the common name JR Takarazuka Line (Osaka - Sasayamaguchi).

Layout
The station has a side platform and an island platform on the ground, connected by an elevated station building.The station has a Midori no Madoguchi staffed ticket office.

Adjacent stations

History
JR Takarazuka Station opened on 27 December 1897. With the privatization of the Japan National Railways (JNR) on 1 April 1987, the station came under the aegis of the West Japan Railway Company.

Station numbering was introduced in March 2018 with JR Takarazuka being assigned station number JR-G56.

Gallery

Hankyu Railway

Lines
Hankyu Takarazuka Station operated by Hankyu Railway is the northern terminus of both the Hankyu Takarazuka Line and Hankyu Imazu Line.

Layout
The Hankyu station has two elevated  bay platforms serving two tracks each.

Adjacent stations

|-
!colspan=5|Hankyu Railway (HK-56)

History
The Hankyu station opened on March 10, 1910.

Gallery

Surrounding area

 Sorio Takarazuka
 Hankyu Department Store
 Sumitomo Mitsui Banking Corporation
 Sorio Hall
 Bus stops (Hankyu Bus Co., Hankyu Denen Bus Co., Hanshin Bus Co.)
 Takarazuka Onsen
 Hana no michi
 Takarazuka Grand Theater, Takarazuka Bow Hall
 Takarazuka Music School
 The Osamu Tezuka Manga Museum
 Takarazuka Garden Fields
 Japan National Route 176
 Mukogawa River

Passenger statistics
In fiscal 2019, the JR station was used by an average of 29,710 passengers daily. During the same period, the Hankyu station was used by 48,894 passengers daily.

See also
List of railway stations in Japan

References

External links

Takarazuka Station (Hankyu Railway) 
Takarazuka Station (JR) 

Railway stations in Japan opened in 1897
Railway stations in Japan opened in 1910
Railway stations in Hyōgo Prefecture
Hankyu Railway Takarazuka Line
Stations of Hankyu Railway
Takarazuka, Hyōgo